The Palawan bulbul or grey-throated bulbul (Alophoixus frater) is a species of songbird in the family Pycnonotidae.  It is endemic to Palawan Island in the Philippines.  Its natural habitats are subtropical or tropical moist lowland forests and subtropical or tropical moist montane forests.  Until 2010, it was considered a subspecies of the grey-cheeked bulbul. The alternate name 'grey-throated bulbul' is also used by the western greenbul.

References

Oliveros, C.H., and R.G. Moyle. 2010. Origin and diversification of Philippine bulbuls. Molecular Phylogenetics and Evolution 54: 822–832.

Palawan bulbul
Birds of Palawan
Palawan bulbul